The 2012–13 UAFA Club Cup knock-out stage matches took place from 8 February to 14 May 2013. A total of 8 teams competed in the knock-out stage to decide the champions of the 2012–13 UAFA Club Cup.

Format
All knock-out ties were decided over two legs, with aggregate goals used to determine the winner. If the sides were level on aggregate after the second leg, the away goals rule applied, and if still level, the tie proceeded to a penalty shootout after extra time is played.

Schedule
The schedule of each round was as follows.

Qualified teams
The knock-out stage featured eight teams: four from Africa zone and four from Asia zone took place in quarterfinals.

 Africa zone teams:
 CR Belouizdad
 USM Alger
 Ismaily SC
 Raja Casablanca

 Asia zone teams:
 Al-Quwa Al-Jawiya
 Al-Baqa'a
 Al-Arabi
 Al-Nassr

Bracket

Quarter-finals

|}

Raja Casablanca won 3–1 on aggregate.

USM Alger won 9–3 on aggregate.

Ismaily SC won 4–1 on penalties.

Al-Arabi won 4–3 on aggregate.

Semi-finals

|}

USM Alger won 4–3 on penalties.

On aggregate 3–3. Al-Arabi won on away goals rule.

Final

|}

USM Alger won 3–2 on aggregate.

References

2012–13 UAFA Club Cup